Martvili is a small town in Samegrelo-Zemo Svaneti province of Western Georgia. Its monastery was Samegrelo's clerical centre in the Middle Ages. Under Soviet rule, from 1936 to 1990, it was named Gegechkori after Sasha Gegechkori, an Old Bolshevik.

References

Cities and towns in Samegrelo-Zemo Svaneti
Kutaisi Governorate